Eugen Schmalenbach (20 August 1873 – 20 February 1955) was a German academic and economist. He was born in Halver, and attended the Leipzig College of Commerce starting in 1898. That college later became part of Leipzig University, only to emerge again as the Handelshochschule Leipzig.

Schmalenbach is best known as a professor at the University of Cologne, and as a contributor to German language journals on the subjects of economics, and the emerging fields of Business Management and financial accounting. He retired from active university life in 1933; one reason for this was to avoid attention, since his wife, Marianne Sachs, was Jewish. The couple had two children, Marian and Fritz. He died in Cologne in 1955.

Schmalenbach was the founder of the Schmalenbach Society, which works for closer links between research in business economics and the world of business.  It still exists, after fusing with another organisation in 1978.

Eugen Schmalenbach is sometimes confused with his brother, Herman Schmalenbach, a philosopher and sociologist known for his sociological concept of the bund, or communion, c.f., Kevin Hetherington ('The Contemporary Significance of Schmalenbach's Concept of the Bund'), and Howard G. Schneiderman ('Herman Schmalenbach,' in The Encyclopedia of Community).

References

Further reading 
"After Schmalenbach - The origins and extension of his School,1873: 1955: 1990 with special relevance to Economic Polity, Information & Decisions", Trinity University archives
Schoenfeld, Hanns Martin. "Schmalenbach, Eugen (1873-1955)." In History of Accounting: an International Encyclopedia,edited by Michael Chatfield and Richard Vangermeersch. New York: Garland Publishing, 1996. pp. 514–516.

External links
 

German economists
1873 births
1955 deaths
Commanders Crosses of the Order of Merit of the Federal Republic of Germany